is a Japanese monthly online variety show produced by Atlus. The show is a monthly digest for Atlus' Persona game series, events, and other Atlus titles meant as a way to "deepen the connection with fans." Persona Stalker Club is hosted by voice actress Tomomi Isomura and writer Mafia Kajita. Episodes are broadcast monthly on Niconico at midnight.

To celebrate the Japanese release of Persona 5, in 2016, the show was rebranded under the title Persona Stalker Club V. Several sticker sets for Line featuring Persona characters, Isomura, and Kajita were released. The "Persora-mimi Theater" segment of the show has led to the release of multiple CDs and a yearly awards ceremony honoring the best fan-submitted misheard lyrics. The final episode aired on March 30, 2017.

Episodes

Persona Stalker Club (2014-2016)

Persona Stalker Club V (2016-2017)

Specials

Persora Awards

Persona Stalker Club had a regular segment called "Persora-mimi Theater", where the hosts would read mondegreen lyrics submitted by fans. The segment's popularity led to a yearly awards ceremony released on DVD honoring their favorite misheard lyrics. Multiple CDs were released during the show's run with a lyrics booklet listing the misheard lyrics.

DVDs

Albums

References

External links
 Official website

Persona (series)
Japanese variety television shows